One Night of Queen is a touring 2-hour stage show, paying tribute to the stage theatrics and music of Queen. It is performed by Gary Mullen & The Works, a band headed by Freddie Mercury imitator Gary Mullen, who had previously won the talent show Stars in Their Eyes with his vocal and visual imitation of Mercury. The other members of the band are David Brockett on guitar, Jon Halliwell on drums, Billy Moffat on bass and Malcolm Gentles on keyboards.

Gary Mullen & The Works

After winning Stars In Their Eyes in 2000 by receiving a record breaking number of votes for the show,  Mullen began touring with his band The Works, putting on a sell-out tribute show known as One Night of Queen.

The show takes references from many 1980s Queen tours, using a modified custom built lighting rig, made to emulate the lighting rigs used during several Queen tours between 1980 and 1986. In a 2018 interview, Mullen was quoted as saying, "We are trying to create something that you'll never see again because you'll never see Queen with Freddie (Mercury) or John (Deacon)."</ref>  Gary Mullen & The Works have taken their One Night of Queen show on numerous world tours across the U.K., Europe, New Zealand, South Africa and the U.S.  In the United States, Gary Mullen & The Works have been doing extensive tours every year since 2008.

Reception
Since it began in 2001, the One Night of Queen show has gained celebrity admirers including actor Kevin Pollak, Governor of Texas Rick Perry, and singer Rick Astley.  During their 2018 U.S. tour, Rob Halford, lead singer of Judas Priest, was in attendance at The Celebrity Theatre in Phoenix, AZ to watch their show.

References

External links
 Gary Mullen and The Works Official Site
Official German Site

Musical groups established in 2001
Tribute bands
English rock music groups

de:Gary Mullen and The Works